Hawies Fourie is a South African rugby union coach, currently in charge of Pro14 side the . He was also a fly-half, centre or fullback as a player.

Career

Fourie spent the majority of his playing career playing for amateur club sides in the Western Cape. He played for the University of Stellenbosch's Dagbreek Koshuis, as well as for the university's second team, Victorians. After playing club rugby for Malmesbury in 1993, he joined Ceres.

He took up coaching, eventually taking charge of Ceres, where he was in charge until 2002. The Boland Cavaliers appointed Rudy Joubert as Director of Rugby and Fourie became the side's backline coach for the 2006 Currie Cup First Division. However, after the side's main sponsor Fidentia went into receivership, they were forced to release Joubert and once again appointed Fourie as the head coach.

He remained in those roles for seven years, but left after the 2014 Super Rugby season to become the head coach of Kimberley-based side . He coached them for two seasons, on each occasion helping them qualify form the Currie Cup qualification series to participate in the Premier Division, before returning to Stellenbosch as the head coach of Varsity Cup side .

References

South African rugby union players
Living people
Rugby union fly-halves
Rugby union centres
Rugby union fullbacks
Boland Cavaliers players
South African rugby union coaches
Year of birth missing (living people)